Hazleton Public Transit (HPT) is a provider of public transportation and demand response service for persons with disabilities for the city of Hazleton, Pennsylvania and its surrounding area.

Routes

All services originate at Church Street Station, an intermodal center located at 126 Mine Street in Downtown Hazleton.  Services operate on a Monday through Friday schedule, however, a modified Saturday schedule, and a modified Sunday schedule operate into key travel locations on those days.

Route are as follows:

 5:  Humboldt Industrial Park
 10:  Hazleton Heights
 20/30:  McAdoo/Kelayres/Beaver Meadows/Weatherly
 40:  Freeland
 50:  Northeast Diamond
 60:  Northwest Diamond
 70:  West Hazleton
 80:  Hazle Marketplace
 90:  Penn State
 95:  Summer Loop
 100:  Sunday Loop
 110:  Saturday Loop
 Wilkes-Barre Shuttle

Bus Fleet

HPT operates with a mix of smaller cutaway style vans and conventional transit style buses to transport passengers.

Presently, HPT operates using Gillig buses including the Low Floor and Phantom models, and Ford E-450 cutaway vans for conventional bus service.

Connections with other agencies

HPT connects with the Luzerne County Transportation Authority at the Wyoming Valley Mall  and Mohegan Sun Casino; Schuylkill Transportation System at McAdoo; and Fullington Trailways in Hazleton at the Church Street Station.

Proposed merger with Luzerne County Transportation Authority

PennDOT has proposed merging HPT operations with the Luzerne County Transportation Authority, creating a unified agency for Luzerne County.  PennDOT makes recommendations that the merger would result in significant savings to both agencies with the merger, due to ending redundancies with upper management positions, an allegation that members of the Hazleton City Council dispute.  PennDOT also assures that passengers would see no changes to services, possibly improvements with better coordination with one team creating schedules.

References

Bus transportation in Pennsylvania
Paratransit services in the United States
Hazleton, Pennsylvania
Transportation in Luzerne County, Pennsylvania